{{Infobox comics character 
| character_name = Egghead
| image          = Egghead_from_DC_Comics.jpg
| converted      = yes
| caption        = Egghead as he appears in the comics. Art by Norm Breyfogle
| first_series   =  Batman"An Egg Grows in Gotham" (October 19, 1966)'
| first_comic    = Batman: Shadow of the Bat #3 (August 1992)
| creators       = Alan Grant Norm Breyfogle
| alter_ego      = 
| full_name      = Edgar Heed
| species        = 
| homeworld      = 
| alliances      = 
| partners       = 
| aliases        = 
| supports       = 
| powers         = Genius-level intelligenceVarious egg-themed weapons
}}
Egghead is a fictional character created for the 1960s Batman television series. Played by Vincent Price, the character was identifiable by his pale bald head and white and yellow suit. He believes himself to be "the world's smartest criminal", and his crimes usually have an egg motif to them; he also includes egg-related puns in his speech and uses various egg-themed weapons. Additionally, Egghead used deductive reasoning to deduce Batman's secret identity.

Background
Similarly to King Tut, Shame, the Siren, Chandell, the Bookworm, and Louie the Lilac, Egghead was created specifically for the 1960s Batman TV series.  Much like Harley Quinn would decades later after initially being introduced in Batman: The Animated Series, Egghead would go on to be introduced in the comics.  

There had been several minor characters known as Egghead, but they were bald secondary gangsters that had little to do with the TV series character. The first, spelled Egg-Head, was an associate, along with bespectacled Fish-Eyes, of jewel thief Michael Baffle in Detective Comics #63 (May 1942). Another Egghead was in Mike Optik's gang in "Dick Grayson, Telegraph Boy!" in Batman #22 (April-May 1944).  He was not very intelligent, and Professor Hendricks tricked him into thinking he was on a rocket in outer space to get him to reveal the location of Optik's hideout.

Marvel Comics' Egghead debuted in December 1962's Tales to Astonish #38.

Fictional character biography
Batman (1966)

Introduced in the second season two-parter, "An Egg Grows in Gotham" and "The Yegg Foes in Gotham", Egghead joins forces with Chief Screaming Chicken (Edward Everett Horton) of the Mohican Indian tribe to revert control of Gotham to the chief's people in exchange for governing the city allowing the criminal underground to run amok, only to be foiled by Batman and Robin.

In the third season, Egghead is joined by his new partner and love interest Olga, Queen of the Cossacks (Anne Baxter), as they attempt to hatch an egg containing a Neosaurus and feed Robin and Batgirl to it in the consecutive episodes "The Ogg and I" and "How to Hatch a Dinosaur" and steal the Sword of Bulbul and the Egg of Ogg, only to foiled by Batman on both occasions. In "The Entrancing Dr. Cassandra", the titular Dr. Cassandra Spellcraft and her husband Cabala free Egghead, among other criminals, from prison to help them take over Gotham, giving them camouflage pills to better facilitate their crime spree and promising Egghead control over Gotham's poultry farms.

Comics

Egghead appears in Batman: Shadow of the Bat #3-4 as an inmate of Arkham Asylum before he is freed by Jeremiah Arkham and fights Batman.

Professor Egghead appears in Gotham Academy #14.

In other media
Television
 Egghead appears in Batman: The Brave and the Bold episode "Day of the Dark Knight!" as an inmate of Blackgate Penitentiary.
 A portrait of Egghead appears in the Harley Quinn episode "Catwoman".

Film
 Egghead, among other villains, was considered by Mark Protosevich to appear in the unproduced film Batman Unchained.
 Egghead appears in Batman: Return of the Caped Crusaders.
 Egghead appears in The Lego Batman Movie as one of several villains assisting in the Joker's attack on Gotham.
 Egghead appears in Batman vs. Two-Face as one of Hugo Strange and Harleen Quinzel's patients.

Miscellaneous
 Egghead makes a minor appearance in Holy Musical B@man!.
 The Batman: The Brave and the Bold incarnation of Egghead appears in issue #16 of Batman: The Brave and the Bold, in which his real name is revealed to be Edgar Heed.
 Egghead appears in issue #3 of Batman '66'' as an inmate of Arkham Asylum. Additionally, in a later one-shot, he is revealed to be Universo's ancestor.

See also
 List of Batman enemies in other media
 List of Batman family enemies
 Egghead (Marvel Comics)

References

Television characters introduced in 1966
Batman (TV series)
DC Comics supervillains
DC Comics male supervillains
Eggs in culture
Fictional gangsters
American male characters in television
Fictional crime bosses
Characters created by Norm Breyfogle
Characters created by Alan Grant (writer)